Beach athletics competition at the 2014 Asian Beach Games was held in Phuket, Thailand from 19 to 22 November 2014 at Naiyang Beach, 5 minutes away from Phuket International Airport. There were seven women's events in original program but high jump and shot put events were cancelled due to lack of entries.

Medalists

Men

Women

Medal table

Results

Men

60 m
20 November

4 × 60 m relay
22 November

Cross-country
21 November

Cross-country team
21 November

High jump
20 November

Long jump
19 November

Shot put
19 November

Women

60 m
20 November

4 × 60 m relay
22 November

Cross-country
21 November

Cross-country team
21 November

Long jump
22 November

References

External links 
 

2014 Asian Beach Games events
Asian Beach
2014 Asian Beach Games